Taman Free School is a residential neighbourhood within the city of George Town in Penang, Malaysia.

History 

Taman Free School mainly consists of low- and medium-cost flats and apartments, which were built in the 1970s. Each of the walk-up apartments is five-storeys high and were not equipped with lifts at the time of construction. In recent years, proposals have been made to rejuvenate the area, which entail the improvement of public facilities and the construction of newer apartments to lower maintenance costs.

Transportation 
Taman Free School is bounded by Jalan P. Ramlee to the north, Free School Road to the south and Jalan Trengganu to the west. The neighbourhood is served by Rapid Penang's bus route 206, which includes stops along the aforementioned roads, and links the neighbourhood with George Town, Green Lane and Gelugor.

Education 

The neighbourhood is served by two adjacent high schools, namely Penang Free School and Heng Ee High School.

See also 

 Batu Lanchang
 Green Lane

References 

Neighbourhoods in George Town, Penang